Caxton Press may refer to:

Caxton Press (New Zealand)
Caxton Press (United Kingdom)
Caxton Press (United States)

See also
Caxton and CTP Publishers and Printers